The Ocala Yearlings were a minor league baseball team based in Ocala, Florida. The team played the then-class D, Florida State League from 1940 through 1941. The team played its home games at Gerig Field, which opened in 1936, utilizing funding from the Works Progress Administration.

Seasons

References

Baseball teams established in 1940
Defunct Florida State League teams
Defunct baseball teams in Florida
1940 establishments in Florida
1941 disestablishments in Florida
Baseball teams disestablished in 1941
Ocala, Florida